The 3-inch anti-aircraft gun M3 was an American anti-aircraft gun which served throughout the 1930s and possibly into early World War II.  Developed from the earlier 3-inch M1917 and 3-inch M1918 guns, 
it was in the process of being replaced by the time of the US entry into World War II, but was subsequently adapted into an anti-tank gun role, both free-standing (as the 3-inch M5) and in a self-propelled tank destroyer (the M10). It may have seen action in the Pacific Theatre.

History
During the late 1920s, M1917 and M1918 guns were fitted with removable barrel liners and re-designated as 3-inch M1, M2, or M3 guns, depending on the variant they were upgraded from.  The most numerous variant was the M3 which was introduced in 1928 and consisted of a new barrel with a removable autofretted liner.  During the 1930s further upgrades were proposed but these were abandoned with the adoption of the 90 mm gun M1 in 1938.

Design
The M3 consisted of a  barrel 50 calibers in length, which had a removable liner and a semi-automatic vertical sliding-wedge breech.  The barrel had a hydro-pneumatic recoil system and when fired the breech ejected the shell casing and remained open until a new round was loaded.  The M2A2 cruciform carriage had a circular center section and four perforated steel outriggers for stability.  For transport, the outriggers folded and a two-wheeled, single axle bogie could be screwed onto the outriggers at each end.  The carriage had pneumatic tires, electric brakes and was capable of being towed at high speeds.  The gun was provided with a set of equilibrators and was capable of both high angle fire +80° and 360° of traverse.

Anti-tank gun
In September 1940 a project started to adapt the 3-inch gun to the anti-tank role, starting with the T9 experimental model but equipping it with the breech, recoil system and carriage borrowed from the 105mm M2 howitzer. The gun was accepted for service as the 3-inch M5.

A similar derivative of the T9 – the 3-inch M6 – was intended to be mounted on the M5 self-propelled gun, which was eventually abandoned. A final adaptation was the 3-inch M7, which included minor modifications for mounting on the M6 heavy tank and M10 tank destroyer. The M7 saw wide use although it was supplanted to some extent by more powerful weapons such as the 90mm M3 and the British QF 17 pounder. A total of 6,824 M7 guns were manufactured.

Ammunition
The M3 fired a Fixed QF 76.2 × 585R round and a number of different styles of ammunition were available:

 Armor-piercing
 Armor-piercing capped
 High explosive

Photo gallery

See also
 G-numbers
 List of anti-aircraft guns

Weapons of comparable role, performance and era
 British Vickers Model 1931
 Japanese Type 88 75 mm AA Gun
 Soviet 76 mm air defense gun M1931

References

External links 
 

76 mm artillery
Anti-aircraft guns of the United States
World War II anti-aircraft guns
World War II artillery of the United States
Military equipment introduced in the 1920s